Miss Mondo Italia, or Miss World Italy, is an Italian beauty pageant in Italy that selects the Italian representative for the Miss World pageant. The pageant was first organized in 1954 and it is not related to Miss Italy or Miss Universo Italia, although some delegates have crossed over from one format to the other throughout the years.

History
While the official winner or 1st Runner-up of Miss Italia represented Italy at the Miss World on a few occasions (from 1959 to 1962, and in 1964 1971 and 1978), the candidate was otherwise selected via castings or independent pageant. The contest gained notoriety in 2000, when winner Giorgia Palmas went on to become the 1st runner-up at Miss World 2000, and found its final incarnation in 2005 as Miss Mondo Italia - La sfida italiana. After a streak of 25 consecutive missed placements from 1974 to 2000, a number of Italian delegates have had strong showings over the last few years: Sofia Bruscoli was a Top 6 finalist in 2005, Giada Pezzaioli made it to the Top 7 in 2010, and Tania Bambaci was a semifinalist in 2011.

Titleholders
Color key

1954-2004

Notes
Miss World started in 1951, but Italy send its first delegate, Cristina Fantoni, only in 1954. Italy withdraws three times: in 1963, in 1969 and in 1977. The highest placement from Italian representative was placing by Giorgia Palmas as the 1st Runner-up and awarding as Queen of Europe in 2000.

References

External links
Miss World Italy website 

2005 establishments in Italy
Beauty pageants in Italy
Italy
Recurring events established in 1954
Italian awards